Newton, Massachusetts has been the home of many notable people.

Academics
 
 Michael Rosbash, geneticist and chronobiologist at Brandeis University, recipient of the Nobel Prize in Physiology or Medicine in 2017
 Daron Acemoglu, economist and professor of economics at MIT
 Frederick M. Ausubel, molecular biologist, professor at Harvard Medical School
 David Berson, neurobiologist, professor at Brown University
 Jean Briggs, anthropologist and expert on Inuit languages, raised in Newton
 J. Walter Fewkes, ethnologist and archaeologist 
 Stanley Fischer, former governor of the Bank of Israel, former professor at the MIT Department of Economics
 Alexandra I. Forsythe, author of the first computer science textbook; helped found the Stanford University Department of Computer Science
 William Tudor Gardiner, 55th Governor of Maine, January 2, 1929 – January 4, 1933
 Caroline D. Gentile, associate professor emeritus of education, University of Maine at Presque Isle
 Michael Hammer, one of the founders of the management theory of business process reengineering
 H. Robert Horvitz, MIT professor of biology; won the Nobel Prize for Physiology or Medicine in 2002 together with Sydney Brenner and John Sulston
 Steven Hyman, neuroscientist and Provost of Harvard University
 Ruth Langer, professor of theology at Boston College; expert on Jewish Liturgy and on Christian-Jewish relations
 Robert C. Lieberman, political scientist and provost of the Johns Hopkins University
 William Stetson Merrill, classifier at Newberry Library; expert on classification of library books, author of A Code for Classifiers
 Arnold A. Offner, historian, author, and former professor
 Rosalind Picard, director of the Affective Computing Research Group at the MIT Media Lab
 Jeffrey Sachs, Harvard professor, 1980–2002; current director of the Earth Institute at Columbia University
 Ruggero Santilli, Center for Theoretical Physics of the Massachusetts Institute of Technology
 Jonathan Sarna, Joseph H. Braun and Belle R. Braun Professor of American Jewish History in the department of Near Eastern and Judaic Studies at Brandeis University
 Andrei Shleifer, economist and professor of economics at Harvard
 Isadore Singer, mathematician, recipient of the Abel Prize (2004) and National Medal of Science (1983), and Institute Professor in the Department of Mathematics at MIT
 Lawrence Summers, former Harvard president, former secretary of the treasury, and nephew of the Nobel Prize laureate Paul Samuelson
 Scott Sumner, economist and professor of economics at Bentley University
 Susumu Tonegawa, MIT professor; won the Nobel Prize for Physiology or Medicine in 1987
 Edward Wagenknecht, literary critic, prolific writer and Boston University professor, lived on Otis Street in West Newton
Melvin M. Weiner, electrical engineer, author, inventor, he was the first to reduce pass-bands and stop-bands in photonic crystals to practice
 Victor Weisskopf, theoretical physicist; worked with Heisenberg, Schrödinger and Niels Bohr; group leader of the Theoretical Division of the Manhattan Project at Los Alamos
 Howard Zinn, radical historian and author of A People's History of the United States

Actors and actresses
 
 Peggy Bernier, actress and comedienne
 Virginia Bosler, actress
 Louis C.K., born Louis Szekely, stand-up comedian, Louie TV series, actor and writer
 Jessica Chaffin, actress, comedienne, and writer
 Priyanka Chopra, actress
Matt Damon, actor, film producer, philanthropist and screenwriter
 Dimitri Diatchenko, actor and musician
 Anne Dudek, actress, played Dr. Amber Volakis in TV series House
 Kathryn Erbe, actress, star of Law & Order: Criminal Intent
 Marin Hinkle, actress, best known for playing Judith Harper on CBS's Two and a Half Men
 Josephine Hull, actress
Jennifer Dundas Actress
 Alex Karpovsky, actor, best known for playing Ray Ploshansky on HBO's Girls
 Jonathan Katz, actor, best known for his starring role on the animated sitcom Dr. Katz, Professional Therapist
 Karen Kondazian, actress and author
 John Krasinski, actor, best known for playing Jim Halpert on NBC's The Office
 Ben Kurland, actor
 Matt LeBlanc, actor, best known for role on sit-com Friends
 Jack Lemmon, Oscar-winning actor
 Christopher Lloyd, actor, best known for playing Rev. Jim in TV series Taxi and as "Doc" (Emmett Brown) in Back to the Future films
 Robert Morse, actor, star of How To Succeed in Business Without Really Trying and Mad Men
 Olga C. Nardone, actress, best known for playing three parts in The Wizard of Oz
 Hari Nef, actress, model, and writer
 B. J. Novak, comedian, writer, best known for playing Ryan Howard on The Office
 Rebecca Pidgeon, actress, singer and songwriter, wife of playwright David Mamet
 Amy Poehler, actress and comedian, Saturday Night Live and Parks and Recreation
 Robert Preston, actor, "Professor" Harold Hill in The Music Man
 James Remar, actor, known for many films and TV series Dexter
 Joe Rogan, actor and comedian
 Eli Roth, film director, producer, writer and actor
 John Slattery, actor, best known for playing Roger Sterling in Mad Men
 Arnold Stang, comic actor
 Brian J. White, actor, best known for his role in The Shield

Artists
 

 David Bowes, painter
 Mickie Caspi, artist, calligrapher
 Tama Hochbaum, artist and photographer
 Roger Kellaway, Oscar-nominated and Grammy-winning composer, arranger, and pianist
 Bow Sim Mark, wushu practitioner; mother of actor Donnie Yen
 Florence Maynard, photographer
 Arthur Polonsky, draughtsman, painter and academic
 Nancy Schön, sculptor of the Make Way for Ducklings statues on Boston Common; also did statues of Winnie-the-Pooh and Eeyore at the Newton Free Library
 Sidewalk Sam (Robert Guillemin), folk artist
 Edwin Lord Weeks, painter
 Morgan Bassichis, American comedic performer, writer, and artist

Authors, writers, journalists, poets
 

 Binyamin Appelbaum, journalist
 Tom Ashbrook, journalist and radio broadcaster
 Isaac Asimov, prolific science fiction and non-fiction writer
 Russell Banks, writer of fiction and poetry
 Alex Beam, columnist for the Boston Globe
 Thomas Bulfinch, author of Bulfinch's Mythology
 Ty Burr, film critic for the Boston Globe
 Virginia Lee Burton, illustrator and author of children's books
 Russell Gordon Carter, writer
 Anita Diamant, author of fiction and nonfiction books
 Ralph Waldo Emerson, essayist, poet, lecturer, philosopher
 Bill Everett, comic book writer, artist (creator of Sub-Mariner, co-creator of Daredevil)
 Ellen Goodman, Pulitzer Prize-winning syndicated columnist
 Ann Warren Griffith, writer
 Dan Harris, correspondent for ABC News; anchor for Nightline; co-anchor for the weekend edition of Good Morning America
 Nate Kenyon, author
 Raymond Kurzweil, writer, futurist, inventor
 Don Lessem, author
 Barry Levy, screenwriter, best known for the 2008 film Vantage Point
 Bill Lichtenstein, Peabody Award-winning journalist and filmmaker
 Melissa Lozada-Oliva, poet and spoken word artist
 David Mamet, playwright, screenwriter and film director
 Adam Mansbach, novelist
 Elizabeth McCracken, author
 Tova Mirvis, novelist
 Diana Muir, writer and historian
 Charles J.V. Murphy, journalist and author
 Michael Novak, author
 William Novak, author
 Robert Pinsky, former Poet Laureate of the United States
 Caroline Mehitable Fisher Sawyer, writer, editor
 Anne Sexton, poet, writer
 Edward Sheehan, journalist and author
 Samuel Shem, playwright
 Harriet Beecher Stowe, author of Uncle Tom's Cabin
 Andrew Szanton, collaborative memoirist
 Celia Thaxter, poet and writer
 Ben Ames Williams, novelist
 Jonathan Wilson, novelist and critic

Business and industry
 

 Roger Berkowitz, owner of Legal Sea Foods
 Charles Bilezikian, co-founder of Christmas Tree Shops
 Elizabeth Boit, textile manufacturer
 Richard B. Carter, head of Carter's Ink Company 1905–1949
 Jim Davis, CEO of New Balance
 Semyon Dukach, professional gambler, entrepreneur, writer
 Leo Kahn, co-founder of Staples
 Jim Koch, co-founder and chairman of the Boston Beer Company
 Louis K. Liggett, drug store magnate
 Eddie Lowery, golf caddy, auto dealer
John Palmer Parker, early Hawaiian rancher, married into Hawaiian royal family
 Sumner Redstone, global media businessman
 Francis Edgar Stanley (1849–1918), co-inventor of the Stanley Steamer 
 Freelan Oscar Stanley (1849–1940), co-inventor of the Stanley Steamer and builder of the Stanley Hotel
 Donald Valle, founder and owner of Valle's Steak House
 Richard Valle, restaurateur; son of Donald Valle; owner of Valle's Steak House

Colonial figures
 

 Waban, 17th-century American Indian tribal chief; lived in Nonantum
 Ephraim Williams, colonel in the colonial militia during the French and Indian War and benefactor of Williams College
 Thomas Wiswall (1601–1683), prominent early citizen of the Massachusetts Bay Colony and Cambridge Village, Massachusetts

Environmentalists
 

 Francis P. Farquhar (1887–1974), former president of the Sierra Club

Government, education and politics
 
 Benigno Aquino Jr. and Corazon Aquino, Filipino public intellectual and political figures; lived with their five children in Newton, 1980–1983; Corazon eventually became the first woman president of the Philippines (1986–1992); their third child and only son, Benigno III or "Noynoy", was elected president in 2010
 Benigno Aquino III, 15th president of the Philippines (assumed office June 2010; term ended June 2016), lived in Newton 1980–1983
 Jake Auchincloss, member of the U.S. House of Representatives for Massachusetts's 4th congressional district
 Thomas Cardozo, first African American State Superintendent of Education in Mississippi (1874–1876)
 Evan Falchuk, founder of the United Independent Party and candidate for governor of Massachusetts in 2014
 Barney Frank, former U.S. Representative for Massachusetts's 4th congressional district
 Joseph Healy, U.S. Representative from New Hampshire
Joseph Kennedy III, son of Joseph P. Kennedy II and former U.S. Representative for Massachusetts's 4th congressional district
 Richard Lakin, Freedom Rider, school principal, terrorism victim
 Horace Mann, public educator, college president (Antioch College) and U.S. Representative from Massachusetts
 Lisa Monaco, United States Deputy Attorney General and former Homeland Security Advisor
 Mohammad Reza Pahlavi, Shah of Iran; exiled after Ayatollah Khomeini took power; lived for a short time in Newton
 Cyrus Peirce, public educator, college president of Framingham State College (once located in West Newton); namesake of the Peirce School in West Newton
John Pigeon, representative of Newton to the Massachusetts Provincial Congress and served as Massachusetts Commissary General while a resident
 Roger Sherman, only person to have signed all four basic documents of American sovereignty: the Continental Association of 1774, the Declaration of Independence, the Articles of Confederation, and the United States Constitution; born and spent his first two years in Newton
 Henry Lawrence Southwick, author, actor and 3rd President of Emerson College (1908–1932)
 Nguyen Van Thieu, exiled President of South Vietnam
 Rochelle Walensky, Director of the Centers for Disease Control and Prevention
 John W. Weeks, mayor of Newton; U.S. Congressman and U.S. Senator from Massachusetts; U.S. Secretary of War under Harding
 Sinclair Weeks, son of John W. Weeks; born in West Newton; like his father, served as mayor of Newton and U.S. Senator; U.S. Secretary of Commerce under President Dwight Eisenhower

Military
 James S. Gracey, Commandant of the U.S. Coast Guard

Music
 

 Leonard Bernstein, composer, conductor, pedagogue, pianist.
 Robert Beaser, composer, professor, The Juilliard School
 Dai Buell, pianist, performed the first piano recital on radio in 1921, lived at the Aloha Bungalow
 Ralph Burns, songwriter, bandleader, composer, conductor, arranger and bebop pianist
 Rob Chiarelli, multiple Grammy Award winner
 Catie Curtis, folk/pop singer
 Stephen Custer, cellist with the Los Angeles Philharmonic, grew up in Newton
 Fat Mike, lead singer and bassist of punk rock band NOFX
 Alfred Genovese, principal oboist of Metropolitan Opera and Boston Symphony Orchestra
 Osvaldo Golijov, Grammy award-winning composer of classical music
 Avi Jacob, singer-songwriter
 Mike Mangini, drummer for Dream Theater
 Vaughn Monroe, singer, trumpeter and big band leader 
 Jane Morgan, popular singer, specializing in traditional pop music
 Jesse Novak, composer
 Aoife O'Donovan, singer-songwriter, lead singer of band Crooked Still
 Seiji Ozawa, Boston Symphony Orchestra Music Director Laureate
 Horatio Parker, composer, first Dean of Yale School of Music, born in Auburndale (a village of Newton)
 Rachel Platten, singer and songwriter
 Seth Putnam, singer and leader of grindcore band Anal Cunt
 Fritz Richmond, jug and washtub bass player
 Mark Sandman, lead singer of the alternative rock band Morphine
 Jason Solowsky, composer

Philosophy, religion and spirituality
 

 Ram Dass (Dr. Richard Alpert), author, philosophic and religious guru
 Mary Baker Eddy, founder of the Church of Christ, Scientist; her last home has been preserved as the Dupee Estate-Mary Baker Eddy Home
 Timothy Leary, author, psychologist, lecturer at Harvard, advocate of L.S.D.-25 (i.e., lysergic acid diethylamide) and other entheogens, jailbird, computer enthusiast

Physicians

 Donald Berwick, former Administrator of the Centers for Medicare and Medicaid Services; candidate for Massachusetts Governor in 2014
 Atul Gawande, general and endocrine surgeon at Brigham and Women's Hospital
 Kurt Julius Isselbacher, M.D., American physician and the former Mallinckrodt Distinguished Professor of Medicine at Harvard Medical School and Director Emeritus of the Massachusetts General Hospital Cancer Center
 Sara Murray Jordan, gastroenterologist

Political activists
 

 Charles Jacobs, founder of the American Anti-Slavery Group and of The David Project Center for Jewish Leadership
 Andrea Levin, director of the Committee for Accuracy in Middle East Reporting in America
 Leonard Zakim, prominent New England religious and civil rights leader

Producers and directors
 

 Brad Falchuk, writer, director, and producer of Nip/Tuck and Glee
 Lyn Greene, writer, director and producer of Nip/Tuck, Boss and Masters of Sex
 Eli Roth, film director, producer, actor
 Bruce Sinofsky, director of documentary films, Brothers Keeper, The Paradise Lost Trilogy, Metallica: Some Kind of Monster (TV series), Iconoclasts
 Julie Taymor, director of Broadway theatre and film

Psychologists and psychiatrists
 

 Julian Jaynes, psychologist
 Kenneth Levin, psychiatrist and historian
 Kurt Lewin, "the father of social psychology"

Radio, television personalities
 

 Paula S. Apsell, television producer
 Tom Ashbrook, host of the NPR radio show On Point
 Maria Lopez, former judge, TV personality
 Jade McCarthy, ESPN sportscaster
 Suzyn Waldman, color commentator for New York Yankees
 Dan “Big Cat” Katz  Barstool Sports

Science, medicine and technology
 

 Michael Rosbash, geneticist and chronobiologist at Brandeis University, recipient of the Nobel Prize in Physiology or Medicine in 2017
 Dan Bricklin, with Bob Frankston, co-creator of VisiCalc, the first spreadsheet
 Charles Stark Draper, inventor of the aircraft inertial guidance system; founder of MIT's Draper Labs
 Wes Hildreth, a USGS geologist born in Newton.
 Reginald Fessenden (1866–1932), inventor and radio pioneer; his house at 45 Waban Hill Road is listed in the National Register of Historic Places
 Bob Frankston, with Dan Bricklin, co-creator of VisiCalc, the first spreadsheet
 Atul Gawande, surgeon, writer for The New Yorker
 Ashish Jha, Dean of Brown University School of Public Health and White House COVID-19 pandemic Response Coordinator
 Jonathan Mann, head of the World Health Organization's global AIDS project
 Charles Johnson Maynard, naturalist and ornithologist; lived in the Charles Maynard House
 Thomas C. Peebles, physician, responsible for first isolating the measles virus, setting the stage for the development of a vaccine
 Judy Smith, nurse who disappeared from Philadelphia in 1997; found murdered in North Carolina five months later
 Rochelle Walensky, Director of the Centers for Disease Control and Prevention and former Chief of the Division of Infectious Diseases at Massachusetts General Hospital
 Frank E. Winsor, civil engineer and chief engineer of the Quabbin Reservoir project

Songwriters
 

 Katharine Lee Bates, professor of English at Wellesley College and author of the lyrics to "America the Beautiful"
 Samuel Francis Smith, Baptist minister and author of the lyrics to My Country, 'Tis of Thee, also known as "America"

Sports

Auto racing 
 
 Pete Hamilton, NASCAR racer, winner of the 1970 Daytona 500

Baseball
 

The following are current and former players of the Boston Red Sox:
 Matt Clement (former)
 Jim Corsi (former) (born in Newton)
 John Curtis (former) (born in Newton)
 Hal Deviney (former) (born in Newton)
 JD Drew (former)
 Bob Gallagher (former) (born in Newton)
 Gabe Kapler (former)
 Mark Loretta (former)
 Doug Mirabelli (former)
 Trot Nixon (former)
 David Ortiz (former)
 Wily Mo Peña (former)
 Jimmy Piersall (former)
 Jason Varitek (former)
 Ted Williams (former)

The following also played Major League Baseball:
 Bob Barr (born in Newton)
 Sean DePaula (born in Newton)
 Bob Dresser (born in Newton)
 Jake Fishman (born in Newton)

The following play for a national team:
 Jake Fishman, American-Israeli (born in Newton; plays for Team Israel)
Ben Wanger, American-Israeli baseball pitcher (born in Newton; plays for Team Israel)

Basketball

 Geoffrey Gray (born 1997), American professional basketball player in the Israeli Basketball Premier League 
 Tom Heinsohn NBA player: died

Boxing 

Joe DeNucci, middleweight boxer and MA State Auditor

Fencing 

 Paul Friedberg, Olympic fencer

Figure skating 
 

 Tenley Albright (born 1935 in Newton Centre), first American female skater to win an Olympic gold medal; other titles included 1952 Olympic silver medal, 1953 and 1955 World Champion, 1953 and 1955 North American champion, and 1952–1956 U.S. national champion
 Gracie Gold, 2014 and 2016 U.S. champion, Olympic team bronze medalist, born in Newton
 Jennifer Kirk, 2000 World Junior champion, born in Newton
 John Summers, 1978–80 national champion in ice dancing

Football
 Kiko Alonso, (current) linebacker for the Miami Dolphins
 Patrick Sullivan, (former) general manager, New England Patriots

Soccer
 

 Daouda Kante, (former) New England Revolution player
 Taylor Twellman, (former) New England Revolution player

Skateboarding
Andy MacDonald, eight-time X Games gold medalist and eight-time World Cup Skateboarding champion

References

Newton, Massachusetts
Newton people